Modiyam Srinivas is a member of the Andhra Pradesh Legislative Assembly, representing the Polavaram Assembly Constituency of West Godavari District, Andhra Pradesh, India.

References 

Living people
Members of the Andhra Pradesh Legislative Assembly
1973 births
Telugu Desam Party politicians